Småland is a historical province in southern Sweden.

Småland may also refer to:

Places

Sweden
Småland and the islands (Småland med öarna), a National Area

Norway
Småland, Frosta, a village in Frosta municipality, Trøndelag county
Småland, Inderøy, a village in Inderøy municipality, Trøndelag county
Småland, Levanger, a village in Levanger municipality, Trøndelag county

Denmark
Smålandsfarvandet, part of the ocean between the islands of Zealand, Lolland, and Falster

Other uses
Småland Nation, Lund, a student nation of Lund University in Sweden
, several ships of the Swedish Navy
Småland, the children's play area in IKEA stores

See also
Smaalenene, the old name of Østfold county in Norway